Wan Chi Keung (May 1, 1956 – February 16, 2010) was a Hong Kong Association football player, actor and businessman.

Known as "Asia's top striker" Wan was a key player for the Hong Kong national football team in the 1970s and 1980s. He played for South China AA and Seiko (football) in the Hong Kong First Division League. After retirement, he became an actor. His most famous role was a senior police officer in the Infernal Affairs trilogy.

He had been dating veteran actress Michelle Yim for almost 30 years.

He was diagnosed with nasopharyngeal carcinoma in the early 1990s but the condition improved over the years. On 16 February 2010, Wan died in Prince of Wales Hospital in Sha Tin.

Filmography 
 The Executor (1981) - Wai
 One Way Only (1981) - Traffic Police Sergeant
 The Head Hunter (1982) - Kenny
 Funny Boys (1982)
 The Turning Point (1983)
 100 Ways to Murder Your Wife (1986) - Party guest
 Eastern Condors (1987) - Col Young's commando
 City Girl (1987)
 The Banquet (1991)
 Perfect Exchange (1993) - Lau Yiu Chor
 Don't Give a Damn (1995) - CID on the bus
 Candlelight's Woman (1995) - Wai
 Infernal Affairs (2002) - Officer Leung
 Infernal Affairs II (2003) - Superintendent Leung
 Infernal Affairs III (2003) - Superintendent Leung
 Moving Targets (2004) - Officer Lai
 When Beckham Met Owen (2004) - David's Father

References

External links
 
 Wan Chi Keung at Hong Kong Movie DataBase

1956 births
2010 deaths
Deaths from cancer in Hong Kong
Deaths from esophageal cancer
Hong Kong First Division League players
Hong Kong footballers
Hong Kong male actors
Hong Kong businesspeople
Seiko SA players
South China AA players
Association football forwards